Paradiaptomus africanus is a species of copepod in the family Diaptomidae. As an example occurrence, Lovenula africana is found within the Makgadikgadi Pans, a seasonal hypersaline wetland in Botswana.

Related species
Other members of this genus are often found in certain African hypersaline lakes. For example, other species within this genus include:

 Paradiaptomus excellens
 Paradiaptomus simplex

References

Diaptomidae
Crustaceans described in 1910